Pinheiro may refer to:

People

Footballers
 Alessandro Pinheiro Martins (1983-2005), Brazilian footballer
 Carlos Alberto Souto Pinheiro Júnior (born 1984), Brazilian footballer
 Erin Pinheiro (born 1997), Capeverdian footballer
 Grazielle Pinheiro Nascimento (born 1981), Brazilian footballer
 João Carlos Batista Pinheiro (1932-2011), Brazilian footballer
 Julio César Pinheiro (born 1976), Mexican footballer
 Juninho Pinheiro (born 1985), Brazilian footballer
 Max Brendon Costa Pinheiro (born 1983), Brazilian footballer
 Moisés Moura Pinheiro (born 1979), Brazilian footballer
 Paquito (footballer born 1981), Brazilian footballer
 Pedro Miguel da Câmara Pinheiro (born 1977), Portuguese footballer
 Rafael de Andrade Bittencourt Pinheiro (born 1982), Brazilian footballer
 Rogerio Pinheiro Dos Santos (born 1972), Brazilian footballer
 Túlio Lustosa Seixas Pinheiro (born 1976), Brazilian footballer

Politicians
 Israel Pinheiro da Silva (1896-1973), Brazilian politician
 João de Deus Pinheiro (born 1945), Portuguese politician
 João Pinheiro Chagas (1863-1925), former Prime Minister of Portugal
 José Baptista Pinheiro de Azevedo (1917-1983), Portuguese politician

Other
 Beatriz Pinheiro (1872-1922) Portuguese writer
 Columbano Bordalo Pinheiro (1857-1929), Portuguese painter
 Heloísa Pinheiro (born 1945), Brazilian model
 Hugo Pinheiro, Portuguese bodyboarder
 Joaquim Pinheiro (born 1960), Portuguese runner
 Moses Pinheiro (17th century), Italian rabbi and Kabbalist
 Nuno Pinheiro (born 1984), Portuguese volleyball player 
 Paulo Sérgio Pinheiro (born 1944), Brazilian diplomat, UN envoy
 Rafael Bordalo Pinheiro (1846-1905), Portuguese artist and comics creator
 Wilson Pinheiro (died 1980), Brazilian activist
 Paulo César Pinheiro (born 1949), Brazilian poet and composer

Places

Brazil
 Pinheiros River,  a river in the State of São Paulo
 Pinheiros (district of São Paulo), a barrio in the State of São Paulo
 Pinheiros, Espírito Santo, a municipality in the State of Espírito Santo
 Pinheiro, Maranhão, place in the mesoregion Maranhão

Portugal
 Pinheiro (Aguiar da Beira), a civil parish in Aguiar da Beira Municipality, Guarda District 
 Pinheiro (Castro Daire), a civil parish in the municipality of Castro Daire
 Pinheiro (Penafiel), a civil parish in the municipality of Penafiel

Other variants:
 Pinheiro Grande, a civil parish in the municipality of Chamusca
 Boavista dos Pinheiros, a civil parish in the municipality of Odemira

Other
 Pinheiro's slender opossum, a species of opossum
 Estádio Engenheiro Vidal Pinheiro, a stadium in Porto, Portugal
 Rafael Bordalo Pinheiro Museum, a museum in Lisbon, Portugal
 Rodovia Floriano Rodrigues Pinheiro, a highway in São Paulo state, Brazil
 Roman Catholic Diocese of Pinheiro, diocese in the state of Maranhão, Brazil

See also
 Piñeiro (disambiguation)
 Piñeyro (disambiguation)

Portuguese-language surnames